Gene Simmons (born 1949) is an Israeli-American musician, singer, and songwriter.
 Gene Simmons (album), his 1978 debut studio album

Gene Simmons may also refer to:

 Jumpin' Gene Simmons (1937–2006), American rockabilly singer and songwriter
 Ronald Gene Simmons (1940–1990), American spree killer

See also
 Jean Simmons (1929–2010), British actress and singer